Working week may refer to

Working Week (band), a British jazz-dance band of the 1980s and 1990s
Working time, the period of time that people spend in paid labour
Workweek, referred to as the working week in the UK

See also
 "Welcome to the Working Week", a song by Elvis Costello on the 1977 album My Aim Is True